The Inscription on the Ceremonial Mounding of Mount Yanran is an inscription composed by the historian Ban Gu of the Eastern Han dynasty and carved by the general Dou Xian on a cliff in the Yanran Mountains (modern Delgerkhangai Mountains) in 89 AD, to commemorate Dou's victory against the nomadic Xiongnu Empire. The text is in the 5th-century official history Book of Later Han, and the inscription was rediscovered by researchers in the Baruun Ilgen hills located south of Inil/Inel (modern Delgerkhangai) mountain, which is in the Gobi desert of Dundgovi Province, Mongolia.

History
In the first year of the Yongyuan era (89 AD), the imperial brother-in-law, General of Chariots and Cavalry Dou Xian, led the joint army of the Han and its allies (Southern Xiongnu, Wuhuan, Di and Qiang) in a battle against the Northern Xiongnu at the Altai Mountains. The battle was a decisive victory for the Han dynasty. 

After the battle, Dou Xian held a memorial ceremony for the Tian at Mount Yanran. He ordered inscriptions to be carved on the cliff face to commemorate the victory. The text was composed by the historian Ban Gu, a member of his staff. The full text was recorded in the Bibliography of Dou Rong (great-grandfather of Dou Xian),  chapter 23 of Book of the Later Han. The inscription starts with a relatively long account of the battle, and concludes with five lines of Chu Ci style poetry.

Cultural significance
Cliff inscriptions on Baruun ilgen (West visible) hills in south of Inel (Delgerkhangai) mountains were commonly used to record military success in ancient China. The inscription of Yanran is one of the best known. The expression "to carve a stone on Yanran" was regarded as one of the highest achievements for military generals.

Rediscovery
Mongolian travel journalist/writer Badamsambuu.G found a cliff with inscriptions in 27 June 2001 and showed on national TV, but researchers were unable to decode the text. It was finally identified in June 2016 by a team that was led by professor Mr. Battulga.Ts from National University of Mongolia. Thus the article "Ancient inscription at Baruun ilgen hills" by Battulga.Ts, Badamsambuu.G, Batjargal.B was published. Then in August 2017, a joint team from Chinggis Khan University, Mongolia, and Inner Mongolia University, China have also expedited the area. The lead archaeologist was Professor Chimeddorji of Inner Mongolia University. Written in typical Han clerical script, the inscription comprises 260 Chinese characters, of which 220 are legible. The text is identical to the recorded text in the Book of the Later Han.

See also
Han–Xiongnu War

References

Chinese inscriptions
Xiongnu
Han dynasty literature
2017 archaeological discoveries
89
Dundgovi Province
Archaeology of Mongolia
1st century in China
1st-century inscriptions